St John's Chapel railway station served the village of St John's Chapel, County Durham, England, from 1895 to 1965 on the Weardale Railway.

History 
The station opened on 21 October 1895 by the North Eastern Railway. It was situated on the south side of a minor road. It had a goods warehouse and a few sidings. The station closed to passengers on 29 June 1953. It became a public delivery siding on 2 January 1961 and closed to goods on 1 November 1965. The track was lifted in September 1966.

References

External links 

Disused railway stations in County Durham
Former North Eastern Railway (UK) stations
Railway stations opened in 1895
Railway stations closed in 1953
1895 establishments in England
1965 disestablishments in England
Stanhope, County Durham
Railway stations in Great Britain opened in the 19th century